Cambodia–Denmark relations refers to the historical and current relationship of Cambodia and Denmark.

Cambodia is represented in Denmark, through its embassy in London.

Denmark is represented in Cambodia, through its embassy in Bangkok, Thailand.

History 
In 1997, Denmark and Cambodia signed an agreement on development cooperation in the areas of the environment and natural resources. In 2001, the first bilateral technical consultations on the cooperation was held in Phnom Penh and an agreement was signed on the implementation of a five-year environmental support program with a total official development assistance (ODA) budget of more than DKK 240 million. On 3 September 2002, Denmark established a representative office in Phnom Penh.

In 2011, the Danish government decided to out-phase its ODA to Asia over a two-year period. As a consequence, the representative office in Phnom Penh was closed in June 2013.

Since June 2013, Denmark is represented in Cambodia, through its embassy in Bangkok, Thailand.

Aid to Cambodia 

Danish development assistance to Cambodia includes a number of efforts undertaken by several Danish organizations.

Denmark supports human rights, democracy and good governance in Cambodia. The Danish International Development Agency (DANIDA) is the official development assistance organization for the State of Denmark, when the country operates aid across the world. DANIDA has adopted a zero tolerance policy against corruption and bribery. On 23 March 2009, a multi-donor funded Trade Development Support Program for Cambodia was officially launched with the private sector development program of DANIDA contributing DKK 39.3 million. This was the last bilateral aid program between Denmark and Cambodia and in 2011, the Danish government decided to out-phase its foreign aid to Asia over a two-year period.

DanChurchAid (DCA) is active in Cambodia with projects that seeks to strengthen women's rights, public access to information, food security and hunger prevention, land rights and climate change adaptations.

A total of 90 million Danish krones were given to Cambodia, from 1992 to 2009.

See also
 Foreign relations of Cambodia 
 Foreign relations of Denmark

References

Sources 
 
  Overview of bilateral high level consultations.

External links 
 Velkommen til Dansk Cambodiansk Forening af 1991 
 High Level Consultations

 
Denmark
Bilateral relations of Denmark